The short-tailed akalat (Sheppardia poensis) is a species of bird in the family Muscicapidae. It has a scattered range throughout Central Africa. Its natural habitats are boreal forests, subtropical or tropical dry forests, subtropical or tropical swamps, and subtropical or tropical moist montane forests.

The short-tailed akalat was formerly considered conspecific to Bocage's akalat (Sheppardia bocagei), but was split as a distinct species by the IOC in 2021.

References

Short-tailed akalat
Birds of Central Africa
Short-tailed akalat
Taxa named by Boyd Alexander